Blanca Portillo Martínez de Velasco (born 15 June 1963) is a Spanish actress.

Career
Portillo started as an actress in several small theater productions before graduating in drama from the Real Escuela Superior de Arte Dramático.

One of her most important performances afterwards was her role of Carol in Oleanna by David Mamet, directed by Joaquín Kremel in 1994.

She made her film debut in Entre rojas (1995). In 1996, Luis San Narciso cast her for the hit Telecinco series 7 vidas,. The series lasted for ten years and ran for 204 episodes. Portillo played the role of Carlota, an insecure but brassy hairdresser who married Gonzalo, the owner of a bar which functioned as the central set of the show.

During the same period Portillo was nominated for the Goya Awards and Actors Union Awards for her role in El color de las nubes in 1997 in which she played a divorced mother who neglected her child. At the same Goyas, she won Best Supporting Actress for the play Eslavos, which focused on the fall of the Soviet Union and the end of the century.  She also participated in the European Spanish dubbing of Finding Nemo. In spite of her success in TV and movies, she has never left theater and she has taken part in several plays both as an actress and as a director.

In 2004, she left 7 vidas to undertake a theatrical project in Argentina named La hija del aire (The daughter of Air) based on a book by Calderón de la Barca. She combined her work on this play with the film Elsa y Fred (2005) in which she plays a woman suspicious of the relationship between her elderly father and his Argentinian neighbor.

In the 2005 film Alatriste, based on a book by Arturo Pérez Reverte, she played a male role, specifically that of a member of the Spanish inquisition. She shaved her head for the role. The following year, Pedro Almodóvar cast her in his 2006 film Volver. She played Agustina, a friend of the central family who is terminally ill and looking for her missing mother.

She then appeared in Goya's Ghosts by Miloš Forman, playing 18th-century consort Maria Luisa of Parma, and landed her first starring role in a movie in Gracia Querejeta's film Seven Billiard Tables. Here she played the lover of the owner of a billiard club and the daughter of Amparo Baró, her former co-star from 7 Vidas. In 2009, she featured again in a film by Pedro Almodóvar, Broken Embraces playing the role of Judit.

Her work in recent years has seen a return to Spanish television, including a role in Hospital Central, and directing roles in the theater. She had a small role in the 2010 Javier Bardem feature Biutiful and the 2011 film As Luck Would Have It, starring alongside Salma Hayek.

She starred in the 2016 film Missing Boy.

Filmography

Theatre 
Actress
 La vida es sueño (2012)
 La avería (2012)
 Antígona (2011)
 Paseo romántico (2010-2011)
 Medea (2009)
 Hamlet (2009)
 Barroco (2007-2008)
 Mujeres soñaron caballos (2007).
 Afterplay (2006-2007).
Hamelin (2005).
La hija del viento (2004–2005).
Desorientados (2003)
Como en las mejores familias (2003).
 A Midsummer Night's Dream (2002)
 El matrimonio de Bostón (2001)
Madre, el drama padre (1998)
No hay burlas para el amor (1998).
Un fénix demasiado frecuente (1997)
Esclavos (1997)
Mujeres frente al espejo (1996)
 El embrujado (1995)
Un bala perdida (1995)
Terror y miseria del Tercer Reich (1995)
Bodas de sangre (1994)
Oleanna (1994)
Las troyanas (1993)
Marat-Dade (1992)
Cuento de invierno (1992)
Lope de Aguirre, traidor (1988)
El mal de la juventud (1985)

Director
 La avería (2011)
Siglo XX... que estás en los cielos (2006)
Desorientados (2004)
Shakespeare a pedazos (1999)
Hay amores que hablan (1997)

TV 
7 vidas (1999–2004)
Acusados (2009–2010)
Promesas de arena (2019)
Días mejores (2022)

Films

Awards 
2006 Cannes Film Festival 
 Best actress shared with Penélope Cruz, Chus Lampreave, Carmen Maura, Lola Dueñas and Yohana Cobo.
Goya Awards 
Candidatura al premio de Mejor Actriz Revelación (1997).
Unión de Actores 
Mejor actriz protagonista (2021)
Mejor actriz de teatro (2004).
Mejor actriz secundaria de teatro (2003)
Candidata al Premio a la Mejor Actriz de Televisión (2002).
Mejor intérprete de teatro de reparto (1997)
Fotogramas de Plata 
Candidata al premio de Mejor Actriz de Teatro (2003).

References

1963 births
Living people
Actresses from Madrid
Spanish television actresses
Spanish film actresses
Spanish stage actresses
Cannes Film Festival Award for Best Actress winners
20th-century Spanish actresses
21st-century Spanish actresses